Vincenz Mayer (born September 27, 1990) is a German professional ice hockey player. He is currently playing for the Ravensburg Towerstars of the DEL2. He previously played with the Grizzlys Wolfsburg in the Deutsche Eishockey Liga (DEL).

References

External links

1990 births
Living people
German ice hockey forwards
EHC München players
Grizzlys Wolfsburg players
Sportspeople from Garmisch-Partenkirchen